The 1918 Maine Black Bears football team was an American football team that represented the University of Maine during the 1918 college football season. In its first and only season under head coach Donald R. Aldworth, the team compiled a 3–1 record. George Ginsburg was the team captain.

Schedule

References

Maine
Maine Black Bears football seasons
Maine Black Bears football